The Pluteaceae are a family of small to medium-sized mushrooms which have free gill attachment and pink spores.  Members of Pluteaceae can be mistaken for members of Entolomataceae, but can be distinguished by the angled spores and attached gills of the Entolomataceae.  The four genera in the Pluteaceae comprise the widely distributed Volvariella and Pluteus, the rare Chamaeota, and Volvopluteus, which was newly described in 2011 as a result of molecular analysis. The Dictionary of the Fungi (10th edition, 2008) estimates there are 364 species in the family.

Selected species 
 Pluteus cervinus, synonym Pluteus atricapillus, or deer mushroom
 Pluteus concentricus
 Pluteus leoninus
 Pluteus murinus
 Pluteus salicinus, or the knackers crumpet (hallucinogenic)
 Volvariella volvacea
 Volvopluteus gloiocephalus

See also
List of Agaricales families

References

External links  
 Family Pluteaceae information and pictures 
The Genus Pluteus
The Genus Volvariella
 Many pictures of species 
 Pictures of species

 
Agaricales families